Ralph Steiner (February 8, 1899 – July 13, 1986) was an American photographer, pioneer documentarian and a key figure among avant-garde filmmakers in the 1930s.

Photographer
Born in Cleveland, Steiner studied chemistry at Dartmouth, but in 1921 entered the Clarence H. White School of Modern Photography. White helped Steiner in finding a job at the Manhattan Photogravure Company, and Steiner worked on making photogravure plates of scenes from Robert Flaherty's 1922 Nanook of the North.

Not long after, Steiner's work as a freelance photographer in New York began, working mostly in advertising and for publications like Ladies' Home Journal. With fellow graduate Anton Bruehl (1900–1982), in 1925, they opened a studio on 47th Street, producing a narrative series of amusing table-top shots of three cut‑out figures dressed in suits for The New Yorker magazine; advertisements for Weber and Heilbroner menswear in a running weekly series. Their client was wiped out in the Wall Street Crash.

Through the encouragement of fellow photographer Paul Strand, Steiner joined the left-of-center Film and Photo League around 1927. He was also to influence the photography of Walker Evans, giving him guidance, technical assistance, and one of his view cameras.

Filmmaker 
In 1929, Steiner made his first film, H2O, a poetic evocation of water that captured the abstract patterns generated by waves. Although it was not the only film of its kind at the time – Joris Ivens made Regen (Rain) that same year, and Henwar Rodakiewicz worked on his similar film Portrait of a Young Man (1931) through this whole period – it made a significant impression in its day and since has become recognized as a classic: H2O was added to the National Film Registry in December 2005. Among Steiner's other early films, Surf and Seaweed (1931) expands on the concept of H2O as Steiner turns his camera to the shoreline; Mechanical Principles (1930) was an abstraction based on gears and machinery.

In 1930, Steiner joined the faculty of the so-called Harry Alan Potamkin Film School, which folded shortly before Potamkin's death in 1933; there he met Leo Hurwitz and, inspired by Hurwitz' ideas of utilizing film as a means of social action, left the Film and Photo League and joined Nykino, a loose coalition of New York-based cinematographers who pooled footage for use in left-wing newsreels shown at worker's rallies, conventions and during strikes. Precious few of these films have survived, most being destroyed in a warehouse fire in 1935. During this time Steiner also worked on some topical, fictional "pool" film satires, including Pie in the Sky (1935), the earliest film to involve the talents of Elia Kazan.

Steiner spent summers at the Pine Brook Country Club located in the countryside of Nichols, Connecticut, which became the summer rehearsal headquarters of the Group Theatre (New York) working with Felicia Sorel and Gluck Sandor among others.

Steiner worked, alongside Strand, Hurwitz and Paul Ivano as a cinematographer on Pare Lorentz' The Plow That Broke the Plains (1936) and likewise joined Lorentz on The River (1938) but did not receive credit. Although Steiner remained with Nykino throughout their transition into Frontier Films, he left in 1938, taking the footage of The City (1939) with him. The City, which Steiner co-directed with Willard Van Dyke and featuring original music by Aaron Copland, opened at the New York World's Fair in 1939 and ran for two years. Henwar Rodakiewicz moved from Los Angeles in August, 1938 to assist Steiner in the production of The City, contributing his editing, writing, and organizational skills to the project.

Despite his own stated disdain of Hollywood and the shared sentiments of his colleagues, in the 1940s Steiner went to Hollywood to work as a writer-producer, but returned to New York after only four years spent there. Then he plunged back into the world of freelance and fashion photography, working for Vogue, Look Magazine and others before retiring in 1962. Steiner then settled in Vermont, where he spent summers on a Maine island.

Late films
After a lengthy break from filmmaking, Steiner resumed the activity on a private basis, creating eight films between 1960 and 1975 grouped under an umbrella title, "The Joy of Seeing." According to Scott MacDonald, these films are marred by inappropriate soundtracks and compromised by Steiner's own desire to avoid artistic pretension at all costs, yet "contain much of Steiner's most beautiful and memorable imagery." Nathaniel Dorsky, who helped edit Steiner's later films, stated that Steiner "didn't want to make anything fancy but was an old man who appreciated life itself and wanted his film to simply show the special magic there was in our visual world in the most ordinary circumstances."

Legacy

Steiner's still photographs are notable for their odd angles, abstraction and sometimes bizarre subject matter; the 1944 image Gypsy Rose Lee and Her Girls is sometimes mistaken for Weegee. His experimental films, however, are considered central to the literature of early American avant-garde cinema, and the influence of Ralph Steiner's visual style continues to assert itself; for example, contemporary avant-garde filmmaker Timoleon Wilkins cites Steiner as an inspiration. In his appreciation of Steiner, author Scott McDonald expands that list to include Dorsky, Andrew Noren, Larry Gottheim and Peter Hutton. The links between the first generation of American avant-garde filmmakers such as Steiner with the second – exemplified by Maya Deren, Stan Brakhage and others – are few, but Steiner is among those who managed to bridge the gap.

Filmography
H2O (1929; cinematographer/director)
Mechanical Principles (1930; cinematographer/director)
Surf and Seaweed (1931; cinematographer/director)
Panther Woman of the Needle Trades, or The Lovely Life of Little Lisa (1931; cinematographer/director)
May Day in New York (1931; cinematographer/co-director)
Dance Film (1931; cinematographer/director)
Harbor Scenes (1932; cinematographer/director)
Granite, a.k.a. The Quarry (1932; cinematographer/director)
G-3 (1933; cinematographer/director)
Café Universal (1934; cinematographer/director)
Hands (1934; cinematographer/co-director)
Pie in the Sky (1935; cinematographer/co-director)
The People's March of Time (1935; cinematographer/co-director)
The World Today: Black Legion (1936; cinematographer/co-director)
The World Today: Sunnyside (1936; cinematographer/co-director)
The Plow That Broke the Plains (1936; cinematographer)
People of the Cumberland (1938; cinematographer)
The River (1938; cinematographer)
The City (1939; cinematographer/co-director)
New Hampshire Heritage (1940; cinematographer/director)
Youth Gets a Break (1941; cinematographer)
Troop Train (1942; cinematographer/director)
The Joy of Seeing (1960-1975; cinematographer/director), includes:
Seaweed, a Seduction (1960)
One Man's Island (1969)
Glory, Glory (1971)
A Look at Laundry (1971)
Beyond Niagara (1973)
Look Park (1974)
Hooray for Light! (1975)
Showdown (1975)

See also
Cloudscape photography

Notes

 Joel Stewart Zukor. Ralph Steiner: Filmmaker and Still Photographer. Unpublished Doctoral dissertation, New York University, New York University, 1976.
 Scott McDonald. "Ralph Steiner" in Jan-Christoper Horak, ed., Lovers of Cinema: the first American film avant-garde, 1919-1945. University of Wisconsin Press, 1998.

External links

Bio from "New Frontiers in American Documentary Film" by Nicole Huffman, University of Virginia

Getty Museum Bio, with reproduction of "Gypsy & Her Girls"
MOMA Collection Page for Ralph Steiner
Canyon Cinema Page for Timoleon Wilkins

1899 births
1986 deaths
American experimental filmmakers
People from Orange County, Vermont
American documentary filmmakers
Photographers from Ohio
Photographers from Vermont